Carrol is both a surname and a given name. Notable people with the name include:

Surname:
Enitan Carrol
Lou Carrol
Regina Carrol

Given name:
Carrol Boyes
Carrol Chandler
J. Carrol Naish

See also

Carl (disambiguation)
Carol (disambiguation)
Carola (disambiguation)
Carril, surname
Carroll (given name)
Carroll (surname)
Carrols (disambiguation)